Pierce M. Barron (1830 – November 4, 1887) was a tavern owner and political figure in Newfoundland. He represented St. John's West from 1859 to 1861 and Placentia and St. Mary's from 1861 to 1869 in the Newfoundland and Labrador House of Assembly as a Liberal.

He was born in St. John's. He owned a tavern in St. John's. He was defeated when he ran for reelection in 1869 as a Conservative. After he retired from politics, Barron was a customs officer at St. John's. He died in Brooklyn, New York in 1887.

References 
 

Members of the Newfoundland and Labrador House of Assembly
1830 births
1887 deaths
Drinking establishment owners
Newfoundland Colony people
Politicians from St. John's, Newfoundland and Labrador